The Macau Baptist Convention (Abbr: MBC)  is a cooperative association of Baptist churches in the Macau Special Administrative Region of the People's Republic of China. It is a member of the Baptist World Alliance.

History
It can trace its origins to the work established by the Triennial Convention missionaries, John and Henrietta Shuck, in 1835. The first Baptist church was, however, only set up in 1905 when the Macau Baptist Church was planted by Charlton Todd. A building was purchased in 1927 at the Rua Pedro Nolasco da Silva to house its congregation and is today also the headquarters of the MBC.

In 1952, the Macau Baptist Mission was founded. 

According to a denomination census released in 2020, it claimed 6 churches and 750 members.

See also 

 Christianity in China
 Christianity in Macau
 Asia Pacific Baptist Federation
 Baptist World Alliance

References 

Baptist
Christian organizations established in 1905
Baptist denominations in Asia
Baptist denominations established in the 20th century
1905 establishments in the Portuguese Empire